Ian King is an English business journalist who presents Ian King Live, the eponymous daily business programme on Sky News.

Early life and career 
King was brought up in Bristol and Devon. He has a degree in history from the University of Manchester (where he edited the students' union newspaper The Mancunion) and a postgraduate diploma in newspaper journalism from City, University of London. Before entering his journalism career, he spent three and a half years working for Midland Bank in the City of London, and then as a business analyst at HSBC.

Career 
King worked at The Daily Telegraph, The Guardian and The Mail on Sunday, before joining The Sun as their business editor in 2000, a position he held for eight years. He became deputy business editor of The Times in 2008 and business and city editor in 2011. He occasionally appeared alongside Jeff Randall on Jeff Randall Live. He succeeded Randall as the face of Sky Newss business coverage at the end of March 2014. Head of Sky News John Ryley said: "Ian's credentials are impeccable. He is a powerhouse in business journalism and I know he will make a real impact with our viewers."

He presents Ian King Live, Sky News' weekday business programme, live from CNBC Europe's studios at 10 Fleet Place.

Controversy 
In August 2015, Ofcom investigated King after he used the word 'fuck' on live television before the 9 pm watershed. King's accidental swear came during an Ian King Live interview with an economist about interest rates in the United States.

Awards 
King has been a business journalist on national newspapers and television for nearly 25 years, and has won the Business Journalist of the Year award twice. The motivational speakers bureau Raise the Bar has described him as a "well-seasoned journalist".

References

External links 
 Ian King on Twitter

Living people
Journalists from Bristol
Alumni of the University of Manchester
Alumni of City, University of London
English male journalists
The Times people
Sky News newsreaders and journalists
British business and financial journalists
HSBC people
The Daily Telegraph people
The Guardian journalists
Daily Mail journalists
The Sun (United Kingdom) people
British television journalists
21st-century British journalists
Year of birth missing (living people)